The 2003–04 QSPHL season was the eighth season of the Quebec Semi-Pro Hockey League, a minor professional league in the Canadian province of Quebec. 14 teams participated in the regular season, and the Dragons de Verdun won the league title.

Regular season

Coupe Futura-Playoffs

External links 
 Statistics on hockeydb.com

Ligue Nord-Américaine de Hockey seasons
3